Irmgard Schwaetzer (born 5 April 1942) is a German politician of the Free Democratic Party (FDP) and a Protestant church official. Since 2013, she has been chairing the Synod of the Evangelical Church in Germany (EKD). She is the central founding figure, as well as honorary chairwoman of the Liberal Women.

Early life and education
In 1971, Schwaetzer received a doctorate in pharmacy from the University of Bonn.

Career
From 1980 to 2002, Irmgard Schwaetzer served as a member of the Bundestag. Under the leadership of chairman Hans-Dietrich Genscher, she was the Secretary General of the FDP between 1982 and 1984.

Following the 1987 West German federal election, Schwaetzer was appointed as Minister of State at the Federal Foreign Office in the government led by Chancellor Helmut Kohl. In that capacity, she oversaw the ministry's activities on European policy and cultural affairs. At a party convention in 1988, she narrowly lost against Otto Graf Lambsdorff in a vote on the FDP leadership.

In January 1991 Schwaetzer was appointed Federal Minister of Spatial Planning, Construction and Urbanism, succeeding Gerda Hasselfeldt. During her time in office, she oversaw various architectural design competitions on construction projects that eventually permitted Germany’s Parliament and government to move from Bonn to Berlin after German reunification.

Following the resignation of Hans-Dietrich Genscher in 1992, Kohl and Lambsdorff nominated Schwaetzer to be the new Foreign Minister. In a surprise decision, her own FDP parliamentary group rejected her nomination shortly after and voted instead to name Justice Minister Klaus Kinkel to head the Foreign Office. Schwaetzer would have been the first woman to hold a senior cabinet post in Germany. She retired on 17 November 1994 from the Federal Government.

From 1998 to 2002, Schwaetzer chaired the working group for labor and social policy, health policy, family, women's and youth policy of the FDP parliamentary group.

Other activities
 Evangelical Church in Germany (EKD), Member of the Council
 Garrison Church Potsdam, Member of the Board of Trustees (since 2015)
 Gegen Vergessen – Für Demokratie, Deputy Chairwoman (since 2014)
 Gemeinschaftswerk der Evangelischen Publizistik (GEP), Member of the Supervisory Board (since 2013)
 Foundation for the Humboldt Forum in the Berlin Palace, Member of the Council (since 2010)
 Evangelical Academy of Berlin, Member of the Board of Trustees (since 2009)
 Studium in Israel, Member of the Board of Trustees
 Friedrich Naumann Foundation, Member of the Board (2003-2014)

Recognition
 1989 – Grand Decoration of Honour in Silver with Sash for Services to the Republic of Austria
 Grand Cross of the Order of Prince Henry
 Grand Cross of the Order of the Falcon

See also
 Evangelical Church in Germany
 List of ministers of the Federal Republic of Germany
 Fourth Kohl cabinet

References

Living people
1942 births
German Lutherans
People from Münster
Free Democratic Party (Germany) politicians
Members of the Bundestag for North Rhine-Westphalia
Members of the Bundestag 1998–2002
Members of the Bundestag 1994–1998
Members of the Bundestag 1990–1994
Government ministers of Germany
University of Bonn alumni
Individualist feminists